Chester Howell Werden (August 10, 1857 – October 31, 1930) was a member of the Wisconsin State Senate.

Biography
Werden was born on August 10, 1857 in Hastings, Ontario. He attended Queen's University. He started his career in lumbering, first in Michigan and later in Wisconsin, where he was active in Merrill and Mason. He moved to Ashland, Wisconsin in 1920. Werden was seriously injured in a traffic accident in 1925 in which his wife was killed. He died at a hospital in Chicago on October 31, 1930.

Career
Werden was elected to the Senate in 1920. Previously, he was chairman of Mason from 1908 to 1913 and chairman of the Bayfield County, Wisconsin Board from 1911 to 1913. He was a Republican.

References

People from Northumberland County, Ontario
Canadian emigrants to the United States
People from Bayfield County, Wisconsin
County supervisors in Wisconsin
Republican Party Wisconsin state senators
Queen's University at Kingston alumni
1857 births
1930 deaths
People from Ashland, Wisconsin